Don't Tell Me Now (1996) is the second studio album by the American indie rock group The Halo Benders.

The album was released on K Records in 1996. It was recorded at Dub Narcotic, in Olympia, Washington. The catalog number is KLP 46.

Critical reception
Trouser Press called the album "wonderful," praising the greatness of the band's "why-not imagination." CMJ New Music Monthly called it "spirited throughout" and "a generally worthy follow-up."

Track listing 
All tracks by The Halo Benders

 "Phantom Power" – 1:51
 "Halo Bender" – 4:30
 "Mercury Blues" – 3:10
 "Bomb Shelter Pt.1" – 1:50
 "Bomb Shelter Pt.2" – 4:15
 "Volume Mode" – 3:18
 "Inbred Heart" – 2:13
 "Planned Obsolescence" – 4:40
 "Magic Carpet Rider" – 2:08
 "Blank Equation" – 3:17
 "Crankenstein" – 4:14

Personnel 

Calvin Johnson – vocals, guitar 
Doug Martsch - guitar, vocals, bass 
Phil Ek – organ on "Planned Obsolescence," additional drums on "Bombshelter Part Two," supervising engineer 
Wayne Flower - bass, drums
Alex Knold - cello on "Blank Equation"
Jen Smith – vocals on "Bombshelter"
Beth Rangert - vocals on "Bombshelter"
Ralph Youtz - drums, guitar 
Steve Fisk - keyboards

References 

1996 albums
K Records albums
Albums produced by Phil Ek
The Halo Benders albums